The Wellingtons were a singing group who performed the title songs for several television programs in the 1950s and 1960s, including Gilligan's Island and Davy Crockett. They also appeared regularly on the televised music show Shindig!.

The Wellingtons were founded by all three members, George Patterson, Ed Wade, and Kirby Johnson. The group, originally called The Lincolns, recorded for Kapp Records. After changing their name, the Wellingtons were signed by Walt Disney to record the theme song for Disney's The Wonderful World of Color. For Disneyland Records, they recorded numerous theme songs, including The Ballad of Davy Crockett for the mini-series Davy Crockett. The Wellingtons can be heard singing "The Ballad of Davy Crockett" in the soundtrack for the movie Fantastic Mr. Fox.

Gilligan's Island producer Sherwood Schwartz had his pilot episodes rejected twice. Before resubmitting a reworked pilot, he decided to use a new theme song.  Working with composer George Wyle he developed a folk song that told the back story of the castaways, and hired The Wellingtons to sing it. The song was a hit. The Wellingtons appear in a second season (1965–66) episode as a rock group called "The Mosquitoes." Not only is the insect-named moniker a play on The Beatles, but the members of the fictitious group are named Bingo, Bango, Bongo and Irving in a reverse play on the names John, Paul, George and Ringo.

The Wellingtons appeared as regulars on the variety television show Shindig! on their own and as backup singers to visiting acts.

They also provided studio backing vocals on recordings by such artists as Annette Funicello, Jan and Dean, and others.

The group traveled with actor Donald O'Connor for six and a half years and toured with The Supremes and Stevie Wonder. The final member of the group still living is founder Ed Wade, who is now an attorney. Kirby Johnson died in 1999 and Patterson in 2015.

References

External links 
  George Patterson
 
  The Ballad of Davy Crockett
 [ All Music Guide]

American folk musical groups
American musical trios